Bagh-e Kabir (also Romanized as Bāgh-e Kabīr and Bāgh-i-Kabīr) is a village in Rahgan Rural District, Khafr District, Jahrom County, Fars Province, Iran. At the 2006 census, its population was 895, in 219 families.

References 

Populated places in  Jahrom County
]